The history of climate change policy and politics refers to the continuing history of political actions, policies, trends, controversies and activist efforts as they pertain to the issue of global warming and other environmental anomalies. Dryzek, Norgaard, and Schlosberg suggest that critical reflection on the history of climate policy is necessary because it provides 'ways to think about one of the most difficult issues we human beings have brought upon ourselves in our short life on the planet’.

Climate change emerged as a political issue in the 1970s, where activist and formal efforts were taken to ensure environmental crises were addressed on a global scale. International policy regarding climate change has focused on cooperation and the establishment of international guidelines to address global warming. The United Nations Framework Convention on Climate Change (UNFCCC) is a largely accepted international agreement that has continuously developed to meet new challenges.

Domestic policy on climate change has focused on both establishing internal measures to reduce greenhouse gas emissions and incorporating international guidelines into domestic law.

In the late 20th and 21st century, climate change policy moved away from attempts to mitigate the impact of global warming and towards adapting to unavoidable changes to the human environment. There has also been a shift towards vulnerability based policy for those most impacted by environmental anomalies. Over the history of climate policy, concerns have been raised about the treatment of developing nations and a lack of gender specific action.

Activism 

Since the early 1970s, climate activists have called for more effective political action regarding global warming and other environmental anomalies. In 1970, Earth Day was the first large-scale environmental movement that called for the protection of all life on earth. The Friends of Earth organisation was also founded in 1970. Between 2006 and 2009, the Campaign against Climate Change and other British organisations staged a series of demonstrations to encourage governments to make more serious attempts to address climate change.

In 2019, activists, most of whom were young people, participated in a global climate strike to criticise the lack of international and political action to address the worsening impacts of climate change. Greta Thunberg, a 19-year-old activist from Sweden, became a figurehead for the movement.

Continuing in the spirit of young activists such as Greta Thunberg, the abandoned village of Lutzerath in North Rhine Westphalia, Germany has seen a growing army of at least 700 protesters from the country itself and around the world (estimated on 10 January 2023) taking over. They are there in defiance of coal mining company RWE who are intent on extracting coal from the Garzweiler Opencast Brown Coalmine near the village. There has been conflict between the protesters and the company since at least 2013, when RWE asked to extend its scope of operation to include Lutzerath and surrounding villages.

With the recent illegal invasion of Ukraine by Russia seeing gas supplies to Europe being curtailed by the Russian government in retaliation to Western sanctions, it seems there is no choice but to increase coal extraction, which flies in the face of recent promises made at the COP26 summit in 2022, held in Glasgow UK. The German government remains steadfast in its promise of reducing greenhouse gas emissions by 2030 and reducing global warming by 1.5 degrees as internationally agreed at COP26, stating it actually wants to reduce coal extraction but is being forced to perform short term extraction to deal with Germany's energy shortage due to the Russian invasion of Ukraine. Germany's Green Party is in agreement with the government's decision to extend mining operations after brokering a compromise that would spare five villages scheduled for demolition. This would appear to be seemingly in opposition to the reason the activists are protesting against the coal extraction.

Luisa Neubauer, a leading German climate change activist, influencer and member of Fridays For Future Germany, has said that she feels the German Green Party has betrayed the ideals of the movement, opting to support short term coal extraction and choosing 'profit over people'.

Origins of political concern 

In the mid-1970s, climate change shifted from a solely scientific issue to a point of political concern. The formal political discussion of global environment began in June 1972 with the UN Conference on the Human Environment (UNCHE) in Stockholm. The UNCHE identified the need for states to work cooperatively to solve environmental issues on a global scale. 

The first World Climate Conference in 1979 framed climate change as a global political issue, giving way to similar conferences in 1985, 1987, and 1988. In 1985, the Advisory Group on Greenhouse Gases (AGGG) was formed to offer international policy recommendations regarding climate change and global warming. At the Toronto Conference on the Changing Atmosphere in 1988, climate change was suggested to be almost as serious as nuclear war and early targets for  emission reductions were discussed.

The United Nations Environmental Programme (UNEP) and the World Meteorological Organisation (WMO) jointly established the Intergovernmental Panel on Climate Change (IPCC) in 1988. A succession of political summits in 1989, namely the Francophone Summit in Dakar, the Small Island States meeting, the G7 Meeting, the Commonwealth Summit, and the Non-Aligned Meeting, addressed climate change as a global political issue.

International policy 
Through the creation of multilateral treaties, agreements, and frameworks, international policy on climate change seeks to establish a worldwide response to the impacts of global warming and environmental anomalies. Historically, these efforts culminated in attempts to reduce global greenhouse gas emissions on a country-by-country basis.

In 1992, the United Nations Conference on Environment and Development (UNCED) was held in Rio de Janeiro. The UNCED (also referred to as the Earth Summit) introduced the Rio Declaration on Environment and Development, Agenda 21, the Forestry Principles and the Convention on Biological Diversity.

The United Nations Framework Convention on Climate Change (UNFCCC) was also introduced during the conference. The UNFCCC established the concept of common but differentiated responsibilities, defined Annex 1 and Annex 2 countries, highlighted the needs of vulnerable nations, and established a precautionary approach to climate policy. In accordance with the convention, the first Conference of the Parties (COP-1) was held in Berlin in 1995.

In 1997, the third Conference of the Parties (COP-3) passed the Kyoto Protocol, which contained the first legally binding greenhouse gas reduction targets. The Kyoto Protocol required Annex 1 countries to reduce greenhouse gas emissions by 5% from 1990 levels between 2008 and 2012.

At the 13th Conference of the Parties (COP-13) in 2007, the Bali Action Plan was implemented to promote a shared vision for the Copenhagen Summit. The Action Plan called for Annex 2 nations to adopt Nationally Appropriate Mitigation Actions (NAMAs). The Bali Conference also raised awareness for the 20% of global greenhouse gas emissions caused by deforestation.

In 2009, the Copenhagen Accord was created at the 15th Conference of the Parties (COP-15) in Copenhagen, Denmark. Although not legally binding, the Accord established an agreed-upon goal to keep global warming below two degrees Celsius.

The Paris Agreement was adopted at the 21st Conference of the Parties (COP-21) on the 12th of December 2015. It entered into force on the 4th of November 2016. The agreement addressed greenhouse-gas-emissions mitigation, adaptation, and finance. Its language was negotiated by representatives of 196 state parties at COP-21. As of March 2019, 195 UNFCCC members have signed the agreement and 187 have become party to the agreement.

In November 2019, a coalition of 11,000 scientists declared that a worldwide climate emergency exists.

Domestic action 
Domestic policy regarding climate change has historically combined the incorporation of international guidelines and the creation of state-specific goals, legislation and programs to address global warming and environmental anomalies at a state level.

Climate change policy in Australia 
Domestic action to address climate change in Australia began in 1989, when Senator Graham Richardson proposed the first greenhouse gas emission reduction target of 20% by 2005. The Australian Government rejected this target. In 1990, Ros Kelly and Jon Kerin announced that the Australian Government would adhere to the goals initially proposed by Richardson but not to any economic detriment.

Australia signed the UNFCCC in 1992. This was followed by the release of the National Greenhouse Response Strategy (NGRS), which provided states and territories with the mechanisms to adhere to UNFCCC emission guidelines. Australia attended the first UNFCCC Conference of the Parties in Berlin in March 1995. Throughout the 1990s, Australia regularly failed to meet its own emission targets and those set by the UNFCCC.

In 1997, Prime Minister John Howard announced that by 2010, an additional 2% of electricity would be sustainably sourced. The following year, the Australian Greenhouse Office (AGO) was established to monitor greenhouse gas reductions. The AGO later combined with the Department of Environment and Heritage. In April 1998, Australia became a party to the Kyoto Declaration. The Declaration was ratified in 2007 under Prime Minister Kevin Rudd.

In the Renewable Energy (Electricity) Act 2000, the Federal Government introduced the Mandatory Renewable Energy Target program, which aimed to sustainably source 10% of electrical energy by 2010. In 2011, the Mandatory Renewable Energy Target program was divided into the Large-Scale Renewable Energy Target and the Small-Scale Renewable Energy Scheme. In January 2003, the New South Wales State Government implemented the Greenhouse Gas Reduction Scheme (GGRS), which allowed carbon emissions to be traded.

Under Rudd, the Labor Government proposed the Carbon Pollution Reduction Scheme, which was intended to take effect in 2010. This scheme was rejected by the Greens for being too permissive and by Tony Abbott's Coalition for being economically detrimental. Under Prime Minister Julia Gillard, the Labor Party passed the Clean Energy Act 2011 to establish a carbon tax and put a price on greenhouse gas emissions. This carbon tax was a divisive partisan issue.

In 2012, the Coalition ran a campaign to repeal the carbon tax. Upon election victory in September 2013, Prime Minister Tony Abbott passed the Clean Energy Legislation (Carbon Tax Repeal) Bill. In replacement of the carbon tax, Abbott introduced the Direct Action Scheme to financially reward businesses for voluntarily reducing their carbon emissions. This was followed by a decision not to participate in the 19th Conference of UNFCCC Parties (COP-19).

Australia became a party to the Paris Agreement in 2015. In the agreement, Australia committed to reducing its emissions by 26% by 2030.

In 2019, Prime Minister Scott Morrison was criticised for a lack of commitment to addressing climate change while taking a vacation during the 2019 bushfires.

Climate change policy in the USA 
 From the mid-1980s, the United States attempted to promote climate action at an international level. The USA ratified the Montreal Protocol of 1987 in a 1990 amendment to the Clean Air Act. In 1993, the Clinton Administration commissioned the Climate Change Action Plan, which lacked both funding and parliamentary support and relied on voluntary compliance.

The Kyoto Protocol was never submitted for ratification in the US. This was because a previous Senate resolution suggested that it would not be ratified. In 2001, President George W. Bush cited economic concerns as a reason for his withdrawal from the Kyoto Protocol. Instead, the administration set an 18% reduction target over the next 10 years.

In 2013, the Obama Administration created the Climate Action Plan, which aimed to cut 32% of carbon emissions from electrical power plants.

In December 2015, the USA became party to the Paris Agreement. President Trump announced his intention to withdraw from the agreement in 2017. This was formalised in 2019, when Trump officially notified the United Nations of the impending US withdrawal. As of 2017, 20 states have pledged to abide with the terms of the Paris Agreement regardless of federal withdrawal.

Trends

Adaptation 
In the early 21st century, policy approaches shifted from mitigation, aiming to reduce the environmental impact of human behaviour, to adaptation. Adaptation based policy focuses on adjusting environmental and human systems to respond to the predicted impacts of global warming. According to Klein, Schipper and Dessai, adaptation is necessary to accommodate permanent changes to the human environment that, regardless of mitigation attempts, cannot be reversed. Haibach and Schneider suggest that climate policy continues to move towards ‘crisis management and plans for preventative measures’. Ford also states that the UNFCCC has evolved to address ‘exposure to predicted climate change impacts’ by stressing the need to adapt.

Vulnerability based policy 
Vulnerability based policy is regionally or socioeconomically specific policy aimed at reducing the disproportionate impacts of climate change on certain groups. This policy is emerging in developing countries in the global south, where communities are more impacted by climate change and environmental disasters. In the Kyoto Protocol, the Least Developed Country fund and Special Climate Change fund were established to improve development and adaptation in regions least equipped to manage the consequences of climate change.  This form of policy has also been linked to sustainable development in developing countries.

In vulnerable arctic regions, climate policy has increasingly focused on addressing changing weather patterns, animal demography and sea ice levels.

Partisan division 
In the late 2000s, the political discourse regarding climate change policy became increasingly polarising. In the United States, the political right has largely opposed climate policy while the political left has favoured progressive action to address environmental anomalies. In a 2016 study, Dunlap, McCright, and Yarosh note the ‘escalating polarisation of environmental protection and climate change’ discourse in the USA. In 2020, the partisan gap in public opinion regarding the importance of climate change policy was the widest in history. The Pew Research Center found that, in 2020, 78% of Democrats and 21% of Republicans in the USA saw climate policy as a top priority to be addressed by the President and Congress.

In Europe, there is growing tension between right-wing interest in migration and left-wing climate advocacy as primary political concerns. The validity of climate change research and climate scepticism have also become partisan issues.

Controversy

Disproportionate impact on developing nations 
Developing nations have commented that climate change and climate change policy disproportionately impact vulnerable states. Ford mentions that international climate policy does not adequately address the different needs and capacities of Annex 1 and Annex 2 states. The New Delhi Declaration of Principles of International Law Relating to Sustainable Development (2002) suggests that developing countries are both more impacted by and less equipped to address climate change. The Declaration also restates the concept of common but differentiated responsibilities. Gupta suggests that these disproportionate impacts justify lowering emission reduction targets for developing nations. Critics of equity-based policy have argued that it is “unfair” to create differentiated emission targets.

Gender 

There is debate over whether policy has addressed the gendered impacts of climate change. Röhr and Hemmati suggest that climate policy does not consider how mechanisms and instruments for change impact women. This inequality is prominent in the global south. A UNEP report suggests that women are more impacted by climate change and climate policy because they have less access to resources and because environmental disasters amplify preexisting 'power imbalances' in the global south. This report also recommends that climate policy should include adaptation programs aimed at improving women's mobility and access to resources during environmental disasters. Gender sensitive climate innovations have also been recommended to address the needs and concerns of women in developing nations.

Röhr and Hemmati also state that women have been underrepresented in climate discourses. A UNEP report states that 'a lack of meaningful participation by women' in local and regional climate movements is having a negative impact on the mobilisation of communities. In a similar study, Buckingham and Külcürl conclude that climate action groups and coalitions do not mirror mainstream gender diversity.

See also
 Global warming
 Individual and political action on climate change
 Timeline of environmental history#21st century
 Politics of global warming

References

Climate change policy
Global politics
Politics of climate change